2022 South Africa floods may refer to:

2022 Eastern Cape floods, in January
2022 KwaZulu-Natal floods, in April